Giovanna Tomanik Diamante (born June 26, 1997 in São Paulo) is a Brazilian swimmer.

At the 2014 Summer Youth Olympics in Nanjing, she won a silver medal in the Mixed 4 × 100m freestyle relay. She also finished 4th in the Mixed 4 × 100 metre medley relay; 5th in the Girls' 4 × 100 metre freestyle relay; 8th in the Girls' 50 metre butterfly; 10th in the Girls' 100 metre butterfly; 15th in the Girls' 200 metre butterfly; and 20th in the Girls' 200 metre freestyle.

At the 2019 Pan American Games held in Lima, Peru, she won a gold medal in the Mixed 4 × 100 metre medley relay, and a bronze medal in the Women's 4 × 100 metre medley relay. She also finished 4th in the Women's 100 metre butterfly and 11th in the Women's 200 metre butterfly.

She has qualified to represent Brazil at the 2020 Summer Olympics.

At the 2020 Summer Olympics in Tokyo, she finished 14th in the Mixed 4 × 100 metre medley relay, along with Guilherme Basseto, Felipe Lima and Stephanie Balduccini.

On 25 April 2021, while swimming the 4x100m mixed medley relay at the Brazilian Olympic Selection Trials, she broke the South American record with a time of 3:45.51, along with Felipe Lima, Guilherme Basseto and Larissa Oliveira.

At the 2021 FINA World Swimming Championships (25 m) in Abu Dhabi, she finished 7th in the Women's 4 × 200 metre freestyle relay, along with Nathalia Almeida, Viviane Jungblut and Gabrielle Roncatto; 12th in the Women's 100 metre butterfly; 11th in the Women's 200 metre butterfly.  and 18th in the Women's 50 metre butterfly. 

She was at the 2022 World Aquatics Championships held in Budapest, Hungary. Participating in the Brazilian 4x100m freestyle relay, formed by Ana Carolina Vieira, Stephanie Balduccini, Diamante and Giovana Reis, she finished in 6th place with a time of 3:38.10. This was the first time Brazil had qualified a women's relay for a World Aquatics Championships final since 2009, and the best placement of the country in this race in Worlds at all times.  In the Brazilian 4x200m freestyle relay, formed by Diamante, Stephanie Balduccini, Aline Rodrigues and Maria Paula Heitmann, she finished in 6th place with a time of 7:58.38. This was the best placement of Brazil in this race in Worlds at all times.  In the 4 × 100 metre mixed freestyle relay, she finished 6th in the final, along with Gabriel Santos, Vinicius Assunção and Stephanie Balduccini, breaking the South American record and equaling the best mark in Brazil obtained in 2015.  In the 4 × 100 metre mixed medley relay, she finished 9th along with Guilherme Basseto, João Gomes Júnior and Stephanie Balduccini. She also finished 10th in the Women's 100 metre butterfly, 10th in the Women's 4 × 100 metre medley relay, 18th in the Women's 200 metre butterfly and 22nd in the Women's 50 metre butterfly.

At the 2022 FINA World Swimming Championships (25 m), in Melbourne, Australia, in the Women's 4 × 200 metre freestyle relay, she broke the South American record with a time of 7:48.42, along with Stephanie Balduccini, Gabrielle Roncatto and Aline Rodrigues. Brazil's relay finished 7th in the final.  She also finished 8h in the Mixed 4 × 50 metre freestyle relay final, 9th in the Women's 4 × 100 metre freestyle relay, 12th in the Women's 100 metre butterfly, 16th in the Women's 200 metre butterfly, 18th in the Women's 200 metre freestyle, and 26th in the Women's 50 metre butterfly.

References

Brazilian female freestyle swimmers
Living people
Brazilian female butterfly swimmers
1997 births
Swimmers from São Paulo
Swimmers at the 2019 Pan American Games
Pan American Games medalists in swimming
Pan American Games gold medalists for Brazil
Pan American Games bronze medalists for Brazil
Medalists at the 2019 Pan American Games
Swimmers at the 2020 Summer Olympics
21st-century Brazilian women
South American Games gold medalists for Brazil
South American Games silver medalists for Brazil
South American Games medalists in swimming
Competitors at the 2022 South American Games